Honey Creek Township is the name of three townships in the U.S. state of Indiana:

 Honey Creek Township, Howard County, Indiana
 Honey Creek Township, Vigo County, Indiana
 Honey Creek Township, White County, Indiana

Indiana township disambiguation pages